Dehshir (also Romanized as Dehshīr) is a village in Dehshir Rural District of the Central District of Taft County, Yazd province, Iran. At the 2006 National Census, its population was 1,332 in 377 households. The following census in 2011 counted 1,028 people in 309 households. The latest census in 2016 showed a population of 1,320 people in 437 households; it was the largest village in its rural district.

References 

Taft County

Populated places in Yazd Province

Populated places in Taft County